Bomont is an unincorporated community in Clay County, West Virginia, United States. Bomont had a post office with ZIP code 25030, which closed in 2011.

The Golden Delicious originated in an orchard at Bomont.

Bomont was first named Pleasant Retreat, but the name was later changed to Bomont.

References

Unincorporated communities in Clay County, West Virginia
Unincorporated communities in West Virginia